Ronold Wyeth Percival King (September 19, 1905 – April 10, 2006) was an American applied physicist, known for his contributions to the theory and application of microwave antennas. He published twelve books and over three hundred articles in his area, as well as mentored one hundred doctoral dissertations.

Born in Williamstown, Massachusetts, he moved to Rochester, New York, where his father worked as a professor of German.  He earned an A.B. (1927) and S.M. (1929) degree in physics from the University of Rochester.  He was an exchange student at the University of Munich (1928–29) and attended Cornell University (1929–30), before completing his graduate studies at University of Wisconsin–Madison (1932) where he obtained a Ph.D. on the thesis Characteristics of Vacuum Tube Circuits Having Distributed Constants at Ultra-Radio Frequencies advised by Edward Bennett and subsequently was a research assistant (1932–34).

King was an instructor and assistant professor in physics at Lafayette College (1934–37), and a Guggenheim Fellow overseas (1937, 1958). He joined Harvard University as an instructor (1938), as assistant professor (1939), associate (1942), and as Gordon McKay Professor of Applied Physics (1946–72, taken over by his former student Tai Tsun Wu), and professor emeritus (1972). He resided at Winchester, Massachusetts, and wrote the autobiography A Man of the 20th Century.

His research group at Harvard spent the 1940s and 1950s developing the theory of antenna (radio), using the cylindrical antenna as a boundary value problem subject to Maxwell's equations. Also, scattering and diffraction of electromagnetic waves from spheres, cylinders, strips, and disks, conducted within earth, under water or in tissue.  King is responsible for the inverted-F antenna, the most widely used antenna in mobile phones.  However, he did not develop this antenna for that purpose.  Rather the intended use was missile telemetry.

Books
Electromagnetic engineering (McGraw-Hill, 1945)
Transmission lines, antennas and wave guides (McGraw-Hill, 1945).  With Harry R. Mimno and Alexander H. Wing
Theory of linear antennas (Harvard University Press, 1956)
The scattering and diffraction of waves (Harvard University Press, 1959).  With Tai Tsun Wu
Antennas and waves, a modern approach (MIT Press, 1970).  With Charles Harrison
Arrays of cylindrical dipoles (Cambridge University Press)
Antennas in matter (MIT Press, 1981).  With Glenn S. Smith
Fundamental electromagnetic theory and applications (Prentice-Hall, 1985).  With Sheila Prasad.
Lateral Electromagnetic Waves (Springer-Verlag New York, 1992).  With Margaret Owens and Tai T. Wu
Cylindrical Antennas and Arrays (Cambridge Press, 2002).  With George Fikioris and Richard B. Mack

Awards
IEEE Fellow, Life fellow
Fellow of the American Physical Society (1941)
Fellow of the American Academy of Arts and Sciences
Distinguished Service Award from the University of Wisconsin (1973)
1983 Prize Paper Award from the IEEE Transactions on Electromagnetic Compatibility
Centennial Medal of the Institute of Electrical and Electronics Engineers (1985)
Harold Pender Award from The Moore School of Electrical Engineering of the University of Pennsylvania (1986)
Distinguished Achievement Award of the Electrical and Electronics Engineers (1997)
IEEE Graduate Teaching Award from the Institute of Electrical and Electronics Engineers (1997)
Chen-To Tai Distinguished Educator Award from the IEEE Antennas and Propagation Society (2001). 
Professor R.W.P. King Education Fund (1972)

References

People from Williamstown, Massachusetts
20th-century American physicists
University of Rochester alumni
Ludwig Maximilian University of Munich alumni
Cornell University alumni
University of Wisconsin–Madison alumni
Harvard University faculty
Fellows of the American Academy of Arts and Sciences
Fellow Members of the IEEE
IEEE Centennial Medal laureates
Fellows of the American Physical Society
1905 births
2006 deaths
American centenarians
Men centenarians